Otto Georg Ammon (December 7, 1842 in Karlsruhe, Baden – January 14, 1916 in Karlsruhe) was a German anthropologist.  Ammon was an engineer from 1863 to 1868. In 1883 he led a geographical and geological exploration of Roman roads. In 1887 he conducted anthropological research and from 1887 onwards he was a member of the Ancient Karlsruher Association and the Natural Science Association. In 1904 he received an honorary doctorate from the University of Freiburg.

He is best known for "Natural Selection among Humans" (1883), in which he argued that a significantly higher proportion of persons of Germanic ancestry are to be found within the European aristocracies.

Literary works
 Natürliche Auslese beim Menschen, 1893 (Natural selection among humans)
 Zur Anthropologie der Badener, 1899 (On the anthropology of the people of Baden)
 Gesellschaftsordnung und ihre natürliche Anlage, 1900 (Social order and its natural application)

1842 births
1916 deaths
Scientists from Karlsruhe
People from the Grand Duchy of Baden
German anthropologists
German eugenicists
Alldeutscher Verband members